The Rural Municipality of Wolseley No. 155 is a rural municipality (RM) in the Canadian province of Saskatchewan within Census Division No. 5 and  Division No. 1. it is located in the southeast portion of the province.

History 
The RM of Wolseley No. 155 incorporated as a rural municipality on December 13, 1909.

Geography 
Wolf Creek flows through the RM. The narrowleaf water plantain (alisma gramineum}, tall larkspur (delphinium glaucum), and common butterwort (pinguicula vulgaris) are species of special concern in this area.

Communities and localities 
The following urban municipalities are surrounded by the RM.

Towns
Wolseley

The following unincorporated communities are within the RM.

Localities
Adair
Ellisboro
Falcon
Grainer
Summerberry, dissolved as a village, December 31, 1972

Demographics 

Government 
The RM of Wolseley No. 155 is governed by an elected municipal council and an appointed administrator that meets on the third Monday of every month. The reeve of the RM is Bev Kenny while its administrator is Rose Zimmer. The RM's office is located in Wolseley.

Transportation 
Highway 1 (the Trans-Canada Highway) bisects the RM.

See also 
List of rural municipalities in Saskatchewan

References 

Wolseley

Division No. 5, Saskatchewan